Kim Mu-ryeok (518 ~ 16 October 579) was a Silla general under King Jinheung in the mid-6th century. The events of his life are known solely through a brief account in the 12th-century chronicle Samguk Sagi. He was the second son of King Guhae, the last ruler of Geumgwan Gaya, who had joined his family with the true-bone elites of Silla. After his father's surrender in 532, Kim joined the Silla military at the high rank of gakgan. In 553, he led his army to seize the northeastern frontier of Baekje. After taking the area, Kim was made its governor. In 554, he met the Baekje armies at Gwansan Castle, killing King Seong and four of his ministers, and taking some 29,000 prisoners.  

Kim was also the grandfather of famed Silla general Kim Yu-sin.

Notes

References

See also 
 List of Silla people
 Three Kingdoms of Korea

Silla people
Military history of Korea
Korean generals
Gimhae Kim clan